Cham Tau Chau is a small uninhabited island in Hong Kong. Administratively, it belongs to the Sai Kung District. It lies within the Inner Port Shelter, south of Sai Kung Peninsula, north of Sharp Island and Tai Tsan Chau. Cham Tau Chau has a coastline of 0.8 kilometres.

See also

 Kiu Tsui Country Park

References

Sai Kung District
Uninhabited islands of Hong Kong
Islands of Hong Kong